The Mundari are a small ethnic group of South Sudan. They are a part of the Karo people, one of the Karo ethnic Group

The group is composed of cattle-herders and agriculturalists and are part of Karo people which also includes Bari, Pojulu, Kakwa, Kuku and Nyangwara. Kutuk na Mundari  is also the name of their language, which is similar to Kutuk na Kuku, Kutuk na Kakwa, Kutuk na Pojulu, Kutuk na Bari, and Kutuk na Nyangwara.

Tribal land 
The traditional Mundari tribal lands are located roughly 75 kilometers north of Juba, the capital of South Sudan, and are centered on the town of Terekeka in the state of Central Equatoria. Their lands are bounded on the east by the White Nile and extend west to Laka Ma'di in Western Equatoria state, an area roughly 100 by 75 kilometers in size.

The land, like much of South Sudan, is predominantly flat and marked by occasional isolated large hills. The low-lying land contains many rivers and lakes and is prone to flooding during the rainy season. The soil is predominantly clay-based, causing drainage and water retention problems, and provides a very fertile basis in support of cattle grazing.

The main settlements in Mundariland are Terekeka, Gemeiza, Mangalla, Muni, Tombek, Tindilo, Tali, Rego, Tijor, Rijong, Koweri, and Nyori.

Culture 

The Mundari, like other Nilotic tribes, are very cattle-oriented: cattle serves as a form of currency and a mark of status. Marriages are arranged by the prospective groom offering cattle to the bride's family and husbands may take as many wives as they can support. The Mundari engage in perennial cattle raiding wars with the Bor Dinka during the dry season.

Mundari men are known to bathe their hair in cow urine, giving it a yellow-orange color.

The Mundari also cultivate sorghum and catch fish using nets and spears.

In common with other Nilotic tribes in Sudan, the Mundari practice ritual scarification as a rite of passage into adulthood for young men. The typical Mundari scar pattern consists of two sets of three parallel lines, each on either side of the forehead, extending in a downward slope and unconnected in the middle. You might be interested in the list of the 64 tribes in South Sudan

External links

 Equatorians Abroad

Ethnic groups in South Sudan
Pastoralists
Nilotic peoples